SK75 may refer to:
Olympic skeet
75m² Skerry cruiser, sailing yacht class